Shahjahan Khan (born 5 March 1995 in Quetta) is a Pakistani-American professional squash player. As of October 2022, he was ranked number 26 in the world and the #1 ranked American.

References

1995 births
Living people
Pakistani male squash players
Competitors at the 2022 World Games